The Falmer Stadium, known for sponsorship purposes as the American Express Community Stadium and more commonly referred to as the Amex, is a football stadium in the village of Falmer, Lewes District, East Sussex. With a capacity of 31,800, it is the second largest stadium in all of South East England, and the 31st largest stadium in the United Kingdom.

It serves as the home of Premier League club Brighton & Hove Albion, and was handed over from the developers to the club on 31 May 2011. The first competitive game played at the stadium was the 2010–11 season final of the Sussex Senior Cup between Brighton and Eastbourne Borough on 16 July 2011. The first league game was against Doncaster Rovers, who were also the opponents in the last game played at Brighton's former stadium, the Goldstone Ground, 14 years earlier.

Falmer Stadium hosted Premier League football for the first time in August 2017, following Albion's promotion at the end of the 2016–17 season.

The stadium was designed to allow hosting for other sports and events. It hosted some matches from the 2015 Rugby World Cup and the UEFA Women's Euro 2022.

History

Plans
The plans were initiated by Brighton & Hove Albion after the club's previous home, the Goldstone Ground, was sold by the club's former board (consisting of Greg Stanley, Bill Archer and David Bellotti) to developers in 1995 with no new home arranged.

When the club was evicted at the end of the 1996–1997 season, it groundshared for two seasons at Gillingham's Priestfield Stadium, 50 miles away in Kent.

Two years later, the club returned to Brighton as tenants of Withdean Stadium, which was upgraded to Football League capacity requirements and later expanded when Brighton reached Division One (now the EFL Championship) in 2002 following two successive promotions.

The site at Falmer was identified during the 1998–99 season and it was hoped that the stadium would be ready in the early to mid-2000s. However, subsequent delays in gaining planning permission meant that the club had to wait until August 2011 before being able to play their home games there – more than a decade after the stadium was first proposed.

Planning permission
Planning permission was given by the unitary authority of Brighton and Hove City Council in June 2002, with the intention of the stadium being ready for the 2005–06 season. The plans for the stadium were opposed by neighbouring Lewes District Council and local residents. While the stadium lies completely within Brighton and Hove, part of the north-east of the site is in Lewes. Bennet's Field, as it is known, is now used for parking.

Further complications were due to both vacant fields, and the campus of the adjacent University of Sussex, being included in the South Downs Area of Outstanding Natural Beauty, although outside the National Park. This led to the designation of the stadium plans being the subject of a separate planning inquiry by the Office of the Deputy Prime Minister.

John Prescott, then Deputy Prime Minister, approved the plans on 28 October 2005. However, Lewes District Council immediately mounted a new legal challenge to the stadium plan. In April 2006, Prescott admitted that he had given his approval based on the misconception that only a small part of the stadium site lay on the Lewes side, and withdrew it.

Hazel Blears, the Secretary of State responsible for planning, re-affirmed the approval on 25 July 2007. Her decision went against the advice of planning inspectors. Lewes District Council, Falmer Parish Council and the South Downs Joint Committee (the three main opponents) announced shortly afterwards that they would not mount a High Court challenge. On 4 September 2007, the deadline for appealing the new grant of permission expired and the club received full permission to proceed.

Construction

On 27 November 2008, the Buckingham Group signed the construction contract for the new stadium and began preparation work on the site on 17 December. The stadium is set three storeys down into the ground. 138,000 cubic metres of chalk was excavated during its construction, which was put on the field on the south side of Village Way. This has been estimated to prevent 22,000 lorry trips taking the chalk to off-site landfill.

Construction at the site started on 17 December 2008 and finished in May 2011. The stadium was designed with scope for expansion, and plans were put in place to increase the capacity.

The stadium was designed by London-based architects, KSS. The stadium capacity has been expanded, with an extra seating tier being installed above the East Stand (Family stand), which increases the capacity to about 30,000 seats. The deal with American Express Europe, Brighton and Hove's biggest private-sector employer, confirming the stadium's naming rights was announced on 22 June 2010.

Opening

The stadium officially opened on 30 July 2011, hosting a friendly match against then-Brighton manager Gus Poyet's old club Tottenham Hotspur, the home-side narrowly losing 3–2.  The first competitive match had been held on 16 July 2011, when Brighton's Development squad beat Eastbourne Borough 2-0 in the Sussex Senior Cup final, with Gary Hart scoring the first goal. The first competitive first team fixture was held on 6 August 2011, when Brighton beat Doncaster Rovers 2–1, after being 1–0 down.

The stadium set its first record attendance with 21,897 against Liverpool. They were also the first away team to win a competitive match at the stadium, beating Brighton 2–1 in a League Cup tie in September 2011. The stadium witnessed its first league defeat in its history when rival side Crystal Palace came from behind to win 3-1.

In use
The stadium uses hawks to scare away seagulls and pigeons. This stops pigeons nesting in the stadium.
On 2 January 2012, Brighton & Hove Albion submitted an application to Brighton and Hove City council to increase the stadium capacity by a further 8,000 seats as well as to add additional corporate boxes, new television facilities and a luxury suite. This was granted unanimously by Brighton & Hove City Council's planning committee on 25 April 2012. The stadium was expanded to 27,250 by the start of the 2012–13 season, 27,750 by December 2012 and stood at 30,750 by the end of the 2012–13 season.

A new record attendance was set on 15 December 2012 when 26,684 saw Brighton draw 0–0 with Nottingham Forest. This record attendance was broken on 26 January 2013, when 27,113 attended a 3-2 defeat against Arsenal in the fourth round of the FA Cup Less than two months later and the record was broken again; this time 28,499 people watched Brighton beat Crystal Palace 3–0 on 17 March 2013. This record was broken once again on 4 May 2013, on the last league game of the season against Wolverhampton Wanderers, 30,003 attended the game. This figure was beaten on 25 January 2015, when Arsenal visited in the FA Cup fourth round to once again win 3–2, in front of an attendance of 30,278. Another new attendance record of 30,292 came on 2 May 2016, when Derby County visited in the last home game of the 2015–16 season. A few weeks later this record was broken again when Brighton and Hove Albion played Sheffield Wednesday in the second leg of the play-offs. The record was broken once again on 24 September 2017 when 30,468 attended Brighton's 1–0 win over Newcastle United. The current record of  31,746 was set at a Premier League match against Chelsea on 29 October 2022.

On 25 March 2013, the stadium hosted England's under-21s international friendly against Austria's under-21s.

In December 2018, it was announced that the stadium would be one of the venues for the UEFA Women's Euro 2022 tournament. On 1 June 2019, the stadium hosted the England women's international friendly against New Zealand.

UEFA Women's Euro 2022
The stadium was one of the ten venues used to host matches at the UEFA Women's Euro 2022. It was used to host Group A matches, which had the hosts England, and a quarter-final, which also involved England.

Rugby Union

The stadium hosted two Pool B matches in the 2015 Rugby World Cup, labelled as the Brighton Community Stadium. The first match was between South Africa and Japan on 19 September 2015 where with 29,290 in attendance, Japan caused one of the biggest upsets in Rugby World Cup history by beating twice winners South Africa 34–32. The other match was between Samoa and United States with Samoa winning 25–16 with 29,178 in attendance. Before them, as a trial run pre-World Cup, the stadium hosted the England U20s vs France U20s match in the final round of the 2015 Six Nations Under 20s Championship.

In 2019, a film was produced telling the story of the match between Japan and South Africa, called The Brighton Miracle,

The stadium was also nominated by Premiership Rugby as the potential home semi final location for Wasps in the 2014-15 European Champions Cup. Defeat in the quarter final vs Toulon however meant this did not happen.

Average attendances

Layout
The West Stand is a three-tiered stand, which holds 11,833 fans, including 14 luxury boxes. The East Stand (including the Family Stand and the premium fans' 1901 Club) holds 13,654 fans, with 10% reserved for away fans during cup games.   The North Stand has 2,688 seats. The South Stand, is for visiting away supporters which contains 2,575 seats.

As well as football matches, the stadium is also designed for other sports such as rugby and hockey, and music concerts, conferences and exhibitions. The stadium's drinking outlets offer real ales from two local breweries, Harvey's and Dark Star, both of which supported the club's appeal for a new stadium at Falmer, along with special guest beers from breweries local to the away teams.

The stadium also incorporates a banqueting and conference facility, a nursery school/crèche, 720 square metres of teaching space for the University of Brighton, 1,200 square metres of office space for the University of Sussex, the club shop for tickets and merchandise and above it the 200 capacity bar/lounge named Dick's Bar after the club's life president, Dick Knight.

Transport

The stadium is close to the A27 Brighton by-pass, linking it northbound to the A23 and M23 motorway towards London and southbound to the A270 and the city centre. There is pre-paid parking available for 2000 cars on the University of Sussex and the Falmer Academy sites. The club runs several park and ride services to the stadium. One of these is at Mill Road situated at the A23/A27 intersection, which holds 500 cars. Another is at Brighton Racecourse, holding approximately 700 cars. The third site is at the University of Brighton's Mithras House on the Lewes Road, holding about 300 cars (this is currently closed). Match tickets include free travel to the stadium by train (from stations as far as Worthing, Haywards Heath, Seaford and Eastbourne), bus, and park and ride. Falmer railway station is next to the stadium; it is a nine-minute journey from Brighton railway station and seven minutes from Lewes railway station, both of which are served by trains from London.
 
The site also includes: a new link road from the A270 skirting the southern edge of Stanmer Park to the Sussex campus; a new high capacity footbridge over the railway at Falmer station; a transport interchange/coach park to the south of the stadium across Village Way; a 1,000-space car park at Brighton Aldridge Community Academy; alterations to the A27/A270 road junction, including a new flyover; a combined footpath/cycleway; a 150-space car park for club officials, players and disabled drivers; 220 cycle spaces.

Awards
In May 2012, the stadium won the New Venue Award at the Stadium Business Awards.

See also
Development of stadiums in English football
Tom Hark (We Want Falmer!)

References

External links

Lewes District Council's High Court challenge
Falmer Stadium 

Brighton & Hove Albion F.C.
Sports venues in Brighton and Hove
Football venues in England
Premier League venues
Sports venues completed in 2011
Rugby union stadiums in England
Rugby World Cup stadiums
UEFA Women's Euro 2022 stadiums